1016 Anitra, provisional designation , is a stony Florian asteroid and suspected asynchronous binary system from the inner regions of the asteroid belt, approximately 10 kilometers in diameter.

It was discovered on 31 January 1924, by German astronomer Karl Reinmuth at the Heidelberg-Königstuhl State Observatory in southwest Germany. The asteroid was likely named after the fictional character Anitra from Henrik Ibsen's drama Peer Gynt.

Orbit and classification 

Anitra is a member of the Flora family, a giant asteroid family and the largest family of stony asteroids in the main-belt.

It orbits the Sun in the inner main-belt at a distance of 1.9–2.5 AU once every 3 years and 4 months (1,208 days). Its orbit has an eccentricity of 0.13 and an inclination of 6° with respect to the ecliptic. The asteroid's observation arc begins at Heidelberg, 12 days after to its official discovery observation.

Physical characteristics 

In the SMASS classification, Anitra is a common, stony S-type asteroid.

Rotation period 

In November 2015, a rotational lightcurve of Anitra was obtained from photometric observations by an international collaborations of astronomers who combined their observational results. Lightcurve analysis gave a rotation period of 5.92951 hours with a brightness amplitude of 0.30 magnitude.

Binary system 

Anitra is a suspected asynchronous binary asteroid, a system with a fairly large separation, for which tidal forces have been insufficient to synchronize the periods within the system's lifetime. The likely minor-planet moon has a rotation period of 2.609 hours and is thought to orbit its primary every 240 hours. The results, however, are still tentative. More than 100 known binaries from the asteroid belt have already been discovered.

Diameter and albedo 

According to the survey carried out by the NEOWISE mission of NASA's Wide-field Infrared Survey Explorer, Anitra measures 9.539 and 10.302 kilometers in diameter and its surface has an albedo of 0.2728 and 0.308, respectively.

The Collaborative Asteroid Lightcurve Link assumes a standard albedo for stony S-type asteroids of 0.20 and calculates a diameter of 12.97 kilometers based on an absolute magnitude of 11.8.

Naming 

This minor planet was probably named after the Arabian dancer Anitra, daughter of a Bedouin chief in Henrik Ibsen's drama Peer Gynt, a five-act play in verse. The music was composed by Edvard Grieg who named one piece "Anitra's Dance".

The official naming citation is based on research by Lutz Schmadel and feedback from astronomers R. Bremer and I. van Houten-Groeneveld.

Notes

References

External links 
 Asteroids with Satellites, Robert Johnston, johnstonsarchive.net
 Asteroid Lightcurve Database (LCDB), query form (info )
 Dictionary of Minor Planet Names, Google books
 Asteroids and comets rotation curves, CdR – Observatoire de Genève, Raoul Behrend
 Discovery Circumstances: Numbered Minor Planets (1)-(5000) – Minor Planet Center
 
 

001016
001016
Discoveries by Karl Wilhelm Reinmuth
Named minor planets
1016 Anitra
001016
001016
19240131